The 1939 New York Yankees season was the team's 37th season. The team finished with a record of 106–45, winning their 11th pennant, finishing 17 games ahead of the Boston Red Sox. New York was managed by Joe McCarthy. The Yankees played their home games at Yankee Stadium. In the World Series, they beat the Cincinnati Reds in four games. This was the first season for the Yankee's radio gameday broadcasts.

Regular season
The 1939 New York Yankees are one of only three Yankees teams (the 1927 and 1998 Yankees being the others) to ever finish the regular season with over a .700 winning percentage, lead the league in runs scored and fewest runs allowed, and go on to sweep the World Series. The 1939 Yankees are the only team to ever outscore their regular season opponents by over 400 runs (967–556).

"The Luckiest Man on the Face of the Earth" 

The 1939 season would be the final time Yankees fans saw the team's starting veteran first baseman Lou Gehrig in action and in the uniform of the team he played for many years, given his declining health. On June 21, the New York Yankees announced his official retirement and proclaimed July 4, 1939, "Lou Gehrig Appreciation Day" at Yankee Stadium. Between games of the Independence Day doubleheader against the Washington Senators, the poignant ceremonies were held on the diamond. In its coverage the following day, The New York Times said it was "Perhaps as colorful and dramatic a pageant as ever was enacted on a baseball field [as] 61,808 fans thundered a hail and farewell". Dignitaries extolled the dying slugger and the members of the 1927 Yankees World Championship team, known as "Murderer's Row", attended the ceremonies.  New York Mayor Fiorello La Guardia called Gehrig "the greatest prototype of good sportsmanship and citizenship" and Postmaster General James Farley concluded his speech by predicting, "For generations to come, boys who play baseball will point with pride to your record."

Yankees manager Joe McCarthy, struggling to control his emotions, then spoke of Lou Gehrig, with whom there was a close, almost father and son-like bond. After describing Gehrig as "the finest example of a ballplayer, sportsman, and citizen that baseball has ever known", McCarthy could stand it no longer. Turning tearfully to Gehrig, the manager said, "Lou, what else can I say except that it was a sad day in the life of everybody who knew you when you came into my hotel room that day in Detroit and told me you were quitting as a ballplayer because you felt yourself a hindrance to the team.  My God, man, you were never that."

The Yankees retired Gehrig's uniform number "4", making him the first player in history to be afforded that honor. Gehrig was given many gifts, commemorative plaques, and trophies. Some came from VIPs; others came from the stadium's groundskeepers and janitorial staff. Footage of the ceremonies shows Gehrig being handed various gifts, and immediately setting them down on the ground, because he no longer had the arm strength to hold them.

Season standings

Game log

|-style=background:#bfb
| 1 || April 20 || Red Sox || 2–0 || Ruffing (1–0) || Grove (0–1) || || Yankee Stadium || 30,278 || 1–0
|-style=background:#bfb
| 2 || April 21 || @ Senators || 6–3 || Gomez (1–0) || Krakauskas (0–1) || || Griffith Stadium || 32,000 || 2–0
|-style=background:#fbb
| 3 || April 22 || @ Senators || 1–3 || Leonard (1–0) || Hildebrand (0–1) || || Griffith Stadium || 12,000 || 2–1
|-style=background:#bfb
| 4 || April 23 || @ Senators || 7–4 || Sundra (1–0) || Chase (0–1) || || Griffith Stadium || 22,000 || 3–1
|-style=background:#bfb
| 5 || April 24 || Athletics || 2–1 || Pearson (1–0) || Dean (0–1) || || Yankee Stadium || 5,820 || 4–1
|-style=background:#bfb
| 6 || April 25 || Athletics || 8–4 || Ruffing (2–0) || Thomas (0–1) || Hadley (1) || Yankee Stadium || 7,268 || 5–1
|-style=background:#fbb
| 7 || April 29 || Senators || 1–3 || Chase (1–1) || Gomez (1–1) || || Yankee Stadium || 11,473 || 5–2
|-style=background:#fbb
| 8 || April 30 || Senators || 2–3 || Krakauskas (1–2) || Hildebrand (0–2) || Carrasquel (1) || Yankee Stadium || 23,712 || 5–3

|-style=background:#bfb
| 9 || May 2 || @ Tigers || 22–2 || Ruffing (3–0) || Kennedy (0–2) || || Briggs Stadium || 11,379 || 6–3
|-style=background:#bfb
| 10 || May 3 || @ Tigers || 10–6 || Sundra (2–0) || Benton (0–1) || Murphy (1) || Briggs Stadium || 14,136 || 7–3 
|-style=background:#bfb
| 11 || May 4 || @ Indians || 10–6 (10) || Murphy (1–0) || Feller (3–1) || || League Park || 12,000 || 8–3
|-style=background:#fbb
| 12 || May 5 || @ Indians || 1–2 (11) || Milnar (1–0) || Gomez (1–2) || || League Park || 9,000 || 8–4
|-style=background:#bfb
| 13 || May 6 || @ Indians || 5–1 || Pearson (2–0) || Sullivan (0–1) || || League Park || 10,000 || 9–4
|-style=background:#bfb
| 14 || May 7 || @ White Sox || 15–4 || Ruffing (4–0) || Whitehead (0–2) || || Comiskey Park || 35,000 || 10–4
|-style=background:#fbb
| 15 || May 8 || @ White Sox || 3–5 || Smith (2–0) || Ferrell (0–1) || || Comiskey Park || 6,000 || 10–5
|-style=background:#bfb
| 16 || May 9 || @ White Sox || 8–6 || Donald (1–0) || Lee (3–2) || Murphy (2) || Comiskey Park || 7,000 || 11–5
|-style=background:#bfb
| 17 || May 10 || @ Browns || 7–1 || Hadley (1–0) || Marcum (2–3) || || Sportsman's Park || 3,782 || 12–5
|-style=background:#bfb
| 18 || May 11 || @ Browns || 10–8 || Pearson (3–0) || Pyle (0–2) || Murphy (3) || Sportsman's Park || 3,167 || 13–5
|-style=background:#bfb
| 19 || May 14 || @ Athletics || 10–0 || Ruffing (5–0) || Caster (3–3) || || Shibe Park || 15,509 || 14–5
|-style=background:#bfb
| 20 || May 15 || @ Athletics || 3–0 || Ferrell (1–1) || Ross (0–3) || Murphy (4) || Shibe Park || 5,000 || 15–5
|-style=background:#bfb
| 21 || May 16 || Browns || 7–5 || Hadley (2–0) || Kramer (3–1) || Donald (1) || Yankee Stadium || 6,503 || 16–5
|-style=background:#bfb
| 22 || May 17 || Browns || 4–3 || Pearson (4–0) || Kennedy (0–4) || || Yankee Stadium || 7,576 || 17–5
|-style=background:#bfb
| 23 || May 18 || Browns || 8–1 || Donald (2–0) || Mills (0–2) || || Yankee Stadium || 6,870 || 18–5
|-style=background:#bfb
| 24 || May 19 || White Sox || 4–2 || Ruffing (6–0) || Smith (2–2) || || Yankee Stadium || 9,755 || 19–5
|-style=background:#bfb
| 25 || May 20 || White Sox || 5–2 || Hildebrand (1–2) || Lee (3–4) || Murphy (5) || Yankee Stadium || 18,371 || 20–5
|-style=background:#bfb
| 26 || May 21 || Indians || 12–6 || Hadley (3–0) || Humphries (1–3) || || Yankee Stadium || 37,531 || 21–5
|-style=background:#bfb
| 27 || May 23 || Indians || 7–3 || Donald (3–0) || Allen (0–2) || || Yankee Stadium || 5,058 || 22–5
|-style=background:#fbb
| 28 || May 24 || Tigers || 1–6 || Trout (1–2) || Ferrell (1–2) || || Yankee Stadium || 10,875 || 22–6
|-style=background:#bfb
| 29 || May 25 || Tigers || 5–2 || Ruffing (7–0) || McKain (1–1) || || Yankee Stadium || 12,087 || 23–6
|-style=background:#bfb
| 30 || May 26 || Athletics || 1–0 || Hildebrand (2–2) || Pippen (0–2) || || Yankee Stadium || 5,139 || 24–6
|-style=background:#bfb
| 31 || May 27 || Athletics || 8–2 || Gomez (2–2) || Parmelee (1–6) || || Yankee Stadium || – || 25–6
|-style=background:#bfb
| 32 || May 27 || Athletics || 11–9 || Sundra (3–0) || Dean (1–2) || Murphy (6) || Yankee Stadium || 30,358 || 26–6
|-style=background:#bfb
| 33 || May 28 || Athletics || 9–5 || Donald (4–0) || Nelson (2–1) || || Yankee Stadium || 14,670 || 27–6
|-style=background:#bfb
| 34 || May 29 || @ Red Sox || 6–1 || Hadley (4–0) || Bagby (3–2) || Murphy (7) || Fenway Park || 17,000 || 28–6
|-style=background:#fbb
| 35 || May 30 || @ Red Sox || 4–8 || Weaver (1–0) || Ruffing (7–1) || || Fenway Park || – || 28–7
|-style=background:#bfb
| 36 || May 30 || @ Red Sox || 17–9 || Pearson (5–0) || Wilson (2–3) || Murphy (8) || Fenway Park || 35,000 || 29–7

|-style=background:#bfb
| 37 || June 1 || @ Indians || 8–3 || Gomez (3–2) || Milnar (3–1) || || League Park || 3,500 || 30–7 
|-style=background:#bfb
| 38 || June 2 || @ Indians || 17–5 || Donald (5–0) || Allen (1–3) || || League Park || 8,000 || 31–7
|-style=background:#bfb
| 39 || June 3 || @ Indians || 3–2 || Hadley (5–0) || Harder (0–3) || Murphy (9) || League Park || 6,000 || 32–7 
|-style=background:#bfb
| 40 || June 4 || @ Tigers || 8–4 || Ruffing (8–1) || Trout (2–3) || Murphy (10) || Briggs Stadium || 44,190 || 33–7
|-style=background:#fbb
| 41 || June 5 || @ Tigers || 0–3 || Bridges (7–1) || Pearson (5–1) || || Briggs Stadium || 9,910 || 33–8
|-style=background:#fbb
| 42 || June 6 || @ Tigers || 2–6 || Newsom (6–3) || Hildebrand (2–3) || || Briggs Stadium || 11,924 || 33–9
|-style=background:#bfb
| 43 || June 7 || @ White Sox || 5–2 || Gomez (4–2) || Lee (4–6) || Murphy (11) || Comiskey Park || 8,000 || 34–9
|-style=background:#bfb
| 44 || June 8 || @ White Sox || 7–2 || Donald (6–0) || Smith (3–4) || || Comiskey Park || 7,500 || 35–9
|-style=background:#bfb
| 45 || June 11 || @ Browns || 8–5 || Ruffing (9–1) || Whitehead (0–5) || || Sportsman's Park || – || 36–9
|-style=background:#bfb
| 46 || June 11 || @ Browns || 5–1 || Hadley (6–0) || Mills (1–4) || || Sportsman's Park || 7,810 || 37–9
|-style=background:#fbb
| 47 || June 14 || Indians || 2–4 || Feller (10–2) || Murphy (1–1) || Milnar (1) || Yankee Stadium || 11,301 || 37–10
|-style=background:#bfb
| 48 || June 15 || Indians || 1–0 || Gomez (5–2) || Harder (1–4) || || Yankee Stadium || 9,619 || 38–10
|-style=background:#bfb
| 49 || June 16 || Indians || 4–3 || Donald (7–0) || Milnar (4–3) || Russo (1) || Yankee Stadium || 10,171 || 39–10
|-style=background:#bfb
| 50 || June 17 || Tigers || 1–0 || Ruffing (10–1) || Newsom (7–4) || || Yankee Stadium || 18,599 || 40–10
|-style=background:#fbb
| 51 || June 18 || Tigers || 5–8 || Rowe (2–5) || Hadley (6–1) || || Yankee Stadium || 32,679 || 40–11
|-style=background:#bfb
| 52 || June 19 || Tigers || 8–5 || Hildebrand (3–3) || Trout (4–4) || || Yankee Stadium || 6,469 || 41–11
|-style=background:#bfb
| 53 || June 20 || White Sox || 13–3 || Pearson (6–1) || Knott (2–2) || || Yankee Stadium || 5,892 || 42–11
|-style=background:#bfb
| 54 || June 21 || White Sox || 9–8 || Sundra (4–0) || Brown (4–1) || Murphy (12) || Yankee Stadium || 10,045 || 43–11
|-style=background:#bfb
| 55 || June 22 || White Sox || 6–1 || Donald (8–0) || Smith (3–5) || || Yankee Stadium || 8,337 || 44–11
|-style=background:#bfb
| 56 || June 24 || Browns || 2–1 || Ruffing (11–1) || Harris (1–2) || || Yankee Stadium || 11,382 || 45–11
|-style=background:#fbb
| 57 || June 25 || Browns || 3–7 || Kramer (6–6) || Murphy (1–2) || Mills (1) || Yankee Stadium || – || 45–12
|-style=background:#bfb
| 58 || June 25 || Browns || 11–2 || Hildebrand (4–3) || Kennedy (4–8) || || Yankee Stadium || 40,861 || 46–12
|-style=background:#fbb
| 59 || June 26 || @ Athletics || 2–3 || Pippen (1–5) || Hadley (6–2) || || Shibe Park || 33,074 || 46–13
|-style=background:#bfb
| 60 || June 28 || @ Athletics || 23–2 || Pearson (7–1) || Nelson (5–3) || || Shibe Park || – || 47–13
|-style=background:#bfb
| 61 || June 28 || @ Athletics || 10–0 || Gomez (6–2) || Caster (5–8) || || Shibe Park || 21,612 || 48–13
|-style=background:#fbb
| 62 || June 29 || @ Senators || 1–2 (12) || Leonard (7–2) || Ruffing (11–2) || || Griffith Stadium || – || 48–14
|-style=background:#bfb
| 63 || June 29 || @ Senators || 7–0 (6) || Donald (9–0) || Chase (3–9) || || Griffith Stadium || 6,500 || 49–14
|-style=background:#bfb
| 64 || June 30 || @ Senators || 10–2 (7) || Hildebrand (5–3) || Carrasquel (4–5) || || Griffith Stadium || 6,000 || 50–14

|-style=background:#fbb
| 65 || July 1 || @ Red Sox || 3–5 || Ostermueller (4–1) || Russo (0–1) || || Fenway Park || 12,000 || 50–15
|-style=background:#fbb
| 66 || July 2 || @ Red Sox || 3–7 || Grove (8–2) || Gomez (6–3) || || Fenway Park || – || 50–16
|-style=background:#bfb
| 67 || July 2 || @ Red Sox || 9–3 || Hadley (7–2) || Auker (6–4) || || Fenway Park || 35,000 || 51–16
|-style=background:#fbb
| 68 || July 4 || Senators || 2–3 || Leonard (8–2) || Pearson (7–2) || || Yankee Stadium || – || 51–17
|-style=background:#bfb
| 69 || July 4 || Senators || 11–1 || Sundra (5–0) || Carrasquel (4–6) || || Yankee Stadium || 61,808 || 52–17
|-style=background:#bfb
| 70 || July 5 || Senators || 6–4 || Donald (10–0) || Chase (3–10) || || Yankee Stadium || 3,874 || 53–17
|-style=background:#fbb
| 71 || July 7 || Red Sox || 3–4 || Dickman (2–1) || Ruffing (11–3) || || Yankee Stadium || 6,588 || 53–18
|-style=background:#fbb
| 72 || July 8 || Red Sox || 1–3 || Ostermueller (5–1) || Hildebrand (5–4) || || Yankee Stadium || – || 53–19
|-style=background:#fbb
| 73 || July 8 || Red Sox || 2–3 || Galehouse (3–3) || Russo (0–2) || || Yankee Stadium || 27,539 || 53–20
|-style=background:#fbb
| 74 || July 9 || Red Sox || 3–4 || Dickman (3–1) || Pearson (7–3) || || Yankee Stadium || – || 53–21
|-style=background:#fbb
| 75 || July 9 || Red Sox || 3–5 || Wilson (5–5) || Hadley (7–3) || Heving (4) || Yankee Stadium || 47,652 || 53–22
|-style=background:#bff
|colspan="10"|7th All-Star Game in The Bronx, New York
|-style=background:#fbb
| 76 || July 13 || @ Tigers || 6–10 || Thomas (5–1) || Murphy (1–3) || Benton (2) || Briggs Stadium || 25,764 || 53–23
|-style=background:#bfb
| 77 || July 14 || @ Tigers || 6–3 || Ruffing (12–3) || Rowe (2–8) || || Briggs Stadium || 19,279 || 54–23
|-style=background:#bfb
| 78 || July 15 || @ Tigers || 10–7 || Pearson (8–3) || Bridges (11–3) || Murphy (13) || Briggs Stadium || 31,253 || 55–23
|-style=background:#bfb
| 79 || July 16 || @ Indians || 5–2 || Gomez (7–3) || Eisenstat (4–4) || || Cleveland Stadium || – || 56–23 
|-style=background:#bfb
| 80 || July 16 || @ Indians || 8–3 || Russo (1–2) || Harder (3–7) || || Cleveland Stadium || 63,064 || 57–23
|-style=background:#bfb
| 81 || July 17 || @ Indians || 3–0 || Hadley (8–3) || Feller (14–4) || || Cleveland Stadium || 10,000 || 58–23
|-style=background:#bfb
| 82 || July 18 || @ Browns || 9–0 || Donald (11–0) || Mills (2–6) || || Sportsman's Park || – || 59–23
|-style=background:#bfb
| 83 || July 18 || @ Browns || 4–3 || Hildebrand (6–4) || Kramer (6–9) || Murphy (14) || Sportsman's Park || 4,853 || 60–23
|-style=background:#bfb
| 84 || July 20 || @ Browns || 2–1 || Ruffing (13–3) || Harris (2–5) || || Sportsman's Park || 3,100 || 61–23 
|-style=background:#fbb
| 85 || July 21 || @ White Sox || 1–4 || Smith (6–5) || Pearson (8–4) || || Comiskey Park || 10,000 || 61–24
|-style=background:#fbb
| 86 || July 23 || @ White Sox || 5–8 || Lyons (10–2) || Gomez (7–4) || || Comiskey Park || – || 61–25
|-style=background:#bfb
| 87 || July 23 || @ White Sox || 5–4 || Hadley (9–3) || Brown (7–4) || Murphy (15) || Comiskey Park || 51,000 || 62–25
|-style=background:#bfb
| 88 || July 25 || Browns || 5–1 || Donald (12–0) || Harris (2–6) || || Yankee Stadium || 6,076 || 63–25
|-style=background:#bfb
| 89 || July 26 || Browns || 14–1 || Ruffing (14–3) || Gill (1–9) || || Yankee Stadium || 4,843 || 64–25
|-style=background:#bfb
| 90 || July 28 || White Sox || 2–1 || Hildebrand (7–4) || Smith (6–6) || || Yankee Stadium || 7,946 || 65–25
|-style=background:#bfb
| 91 || July 30 || White Sox || 4–3 || Gomez (8–4) || Lyons (10–3) || Murphy (16) || Yankee Stadium || – || 66–25
|-style=background:#fbb
| 92 || July 30 || White Sox || 1–5 || Lee (9–8) || Hadley (9–4) || || Yankee Stadium || 35,256 || 66–26

|-style=background:#fbb
| 93 || August 1 || Tigers || 2–5 || Trout (6–7) || Ruffing (14–4) || McKain (3) || Yankee Stadium || 10,382 || 66–27
|-style=background:#fbb
| 94 || August 2 || Tigers || 2–7 || Rowe (4–9) || Donald (12–1) || || Yankee Stadium || 12,341 || 66–28
|-style=background:#bfb
| 95 || August 3 || Tigers || 12–3 || Pearson (9–4) || Newsom (12–8) || || Yankee Stadium || 9,010 || 67–28
|-style=background:#bfb
| 96 || August 4 || Indians || 5–4 || Hildebrand (8–4) || Milnar (6–8) || Russo (2) || Yankee Stadium || 6,263 || 68–28
|-style=background:#bfb
| 97 || August 5 || Indians || 6–1 || Ruffing (15–4) || Eisenstat (5–5) || || Yankee Stadium || 13,207 || 69–28
|-style=background:#fbb
| 98 || August 6 || Indians || 4–5 || Feller (16–6) || Gomez (8–5) || || Yankee Stadium || – || 69–29
|-style=background:#fbb
| 99 || August 6 || Indians || 1–7 || Harder (7–7) || Hadley (9–5) || || Yankee Stadium || 76,753 || 69–30
|-style=background:#fbb
| 100 || August 8 || @ Senators || 4–7 || Krakauskas (9–11) || Donald (12–2) || Appleton (5) || Griffith Stadium || 12,000 || 69–31
|-style=background:#bfb
| 101 || August 9 || @ Senators || 13–8 || Ruffing (16–4) || Chase (7–14) || Hildebrand (1) || Griffith Stadium || 14,000 || 70–31
|-style=background:#fbb
| 102 || August 10 || @ Senators || 5–7 || Leonard (13–4) || Pearson (9–5) || Appleton (6) || Griffith Stadium || 14,000 || 70–32
|-style=background:#bfb
| 103 || August 11 || @ Athletics || 9–5 || Gomez (9–5) || Potter (6–8) || Hadley (2) || Shibe Park || 14,116 || 71–32
|-style=background:#bfb
| 104 || August 12 || @ Athletics || 18–4 || Sundra (6–0) || Joyce (3–5) || || Shibe Park || 4,000 || 72–32
|-style=background:#fbb
| 105 || August 13 || @ Athletics || 9–12 || Nelson (7–7) || Russo (1–3) || || Shibe Park || – || 72–33
|-style=background:#bfb
| 106 || August 13 || @ Athletics || 21–0 (8) || Ruffing (17–4) || Pippen (2–9) || || Shibe Park || 34,570 || 73–33
|-style=background:#bfb
| 107 || August 15 || Senators || 3–2 (10) || Gomez (10–5) || Chase (7–15) || || Yankee Stadium || 8,049 || 74–33
|-style=background:#bfb
| 108 || August 16 || Senators || 4–0 || Russo (2–3) || Leonard (13–5) || || Yankee Stadium || 6,607 || 75–33
|-style=background:#bfb
| 109 || August 17 || Senators || 9–8 (10) || Murphy (2–3) || Appleton (3–8) || || Yankee Stadium || 6,704 || 76–33
|-style=background:#bfb
| 110 || August 18 || Athletics || 5–0 || Ruffing (18–4) || Pippen (2–10) || || Yankee Stadium || 6,041 || 77–33
|-style=background:#fbb
| 111 || August 20 || Athletics || 4–5 || Ross (5–11) || Gomez (10–6) || || Yankee Stadium || – || 77–34 
|-style=background:#bfb
| 112 || August 20 || Athletics || 5–1 || Sundra (7–0) || Nelson (8–8) || || Yankee Stadium || 33,562 || 78–34
|-style=background:#bfb
| 113 || August 22 || @ White Sox || 14–5 || Russo (3–3) || Marcum (5–7) || || Comiskey Park || 50,000 || 79–34
|-style=background:#bfb
| 114 || August 23 || @ White Sox || 7–2 || Donald (13–2) || Smith (8–8) || || Comiskey Park || – || 80–34
|-style=background:#bfb
| 115 || August 23 || @ White Sox || 16–4 || Ruffing (19–4) || Lee (11–9) || || Comiskey Park || 27,000 || 81–34
|-style=background:#bfb
| 116 || August 24 || @ Browns || 11–5 || Pearson (10–5) || Mills (3–9) || Murphy (17) || Sportsman's Park || 1,225 || 82–34
|-style=background:#bfb
| 117 || August 25 || @ Browns || 11–0 || Sundra (8–0) || Kennedy (8–16) || || Sportsman's Park || – || 83–34
|-style=background:#bfb
| 118 || August 25 || @ Browns || 8–2 || Gomez (11–6) || Gill (1–11) || || Sportsman's Park || 2,182 || 84–34
|-style=background:#bfb
| 119 || August 26 || @ Browns || 6–1 || Hadley (10–5) || Harris (2–10) || || Sportsman's Park || 2,967 || 85–34
|-style=background:#bfb
| 120 || August 27 || @ Tigers || 13–3 || Ruffing (20–4) || Rowe (7–10) || || Briggs Stadium || 47,966 || 86–34
|-style=background:#bfb
| 121 || August 28 || @ Tigers || 18–2 || Russo (4–3) || Bridges (16–5) || || Briggs Stadium || 14,281 || 87–34
|-style=background:#fbb
| 122 || August 29 || @ Tigers || 6–7 || McKain (3–4) || Murphy (2–4) || || Briggs Stadium || 11,397 || 87–35
|-style=background:#fbb
| 123 || August 30 || @ Indians || 3–4 (10) || Eisenstat (7–6) || Murphy (2–5) || || Cleveland Stadium || 35,336 || 87–36

|-style=background:#bfb
| 124 || September 1 || @ Indians || 11–8 || Chandler (1–0) || Eisenstat (7–7) || Russo (3) || Cleveland Stadium || 20,000 || 88–36
|-style=background:#fbb
| 125 || September 2 || @ Red Sox || 7–12 || Ostermueller (11–3) || Ruffing (20–5) || Heving (7) || Fenway Park || 12,500 || 88–37
|-style=background:#fbb
| 126 || September 3 || @ Red Sox || 11–12 || Auker (9–8) || Murphy (2–6) || Heving (8) || Fenway Park || – || 88–38
|-
| 127 || September 3 || @ Red Sox || 5–5 (7) || || || || Fenway Park || 27,000 || 88–38
|-style=background:#bfb
| 128 || September 4 || @ Athletics || 7–6 || Chandler (2–0) || Potter (7–10) || Murphy (18) || Shibe Park || – || 89–38
|-style=background:#bfb
| 129 || September 4 || @ Athletics || 2–0 || Russo (5–3) || Nelson (9–10) || || Shibe Park || 24,126 || 90–38
|-style=background:#bfb
| 130 || September 6 || Red Sox || 2–1 || Gomez (12–6) || Grove (13–4) || || Yankee Stadium || 11,715 || 91–38
|-style=background:#bfb
| 131 || September 7 || Red Sox || 5–2 || Pearson (11–5) || Ostermueller (11–4) || Hildebrand (2) || Yankee Stadium || 9,379 || 92–38
|-style=background:#bfb
| 132 || September 8 || Red Sox || 4–1 (7) || Ruffing (21–5) || Galehouse (7–9) || || Yankee Stadium || 8,457 || 93–38
|-style=background:#bfb
| 133 || September 9 || Senators || 5–2 || Sundra (9–0) || Haynes (6–12) || || Yankee Stadium || 7,401 || 94–38
|-style=background:#bfb
| 134 || September 10 || Senators || 4–3 || Russo (6–3) || Appleton (4–10) || || Yankee Stadium || – || 95–38
|-style=background:#bfb
| 135 || September 10 || Senators || 6–2 || Hadley (11–5) || Leonard (17–7) || Murphy (19) || Yankee Stadium || 12,088 || 96–38
|-style=background:#fbb
| 136 || September 12 || Indians || 3–4 (10) || Harder (12–8) || Gomez (12–7) || || Yankee Stadium || 4,638 || 96–39
|-style=background:#fbb
| 137 || September 13 || Indians || 4–9 || Feller (21–8) || Ruffing (21–6) || || Yankee Stadium || 9,898 || 96–40
|-style=background:#fbb
| 138 || September 14 || Tigers || 1–6 || Newsom (17–11) || Donald (13–3) || || Yankee Stadium || 10,938 || 96–41
|-style=background:#bfb
| 139 || September 15 || Tigers || 10–3 || Sundra (10–0) || Rowe (8–11) || || Yankee Stadium || 10,538 || 97–41
|-style=background:#bfb
| 140 || September 16 || Tigers || 8–5 || Russo (7–3) || Pippen (4–12) || || Yankee Stadium || 10,626 || 98–41
|-style=background:#fbb
| 141 || September 17 || Browns || 4–8 || Kramer (9–14) || Ruffing (21–7) || || Yankee Stadium || – || 98–42
|-style=background:#fbb
| 142 || September 17 || Browns || 1–3 || Mills (4–11) || Gomez (12–8) || || Yankee Stadium || 21,027 || 98–43
|-style=background:#bfb
| 143 || September 18 || Browns || 6–2 || Hadley (12–5) || Wade (1–5) || || Yankee Stadium || 1,678 || 99–43
|-style=background:#bfb
| 144 || September 19 || White Sox || 6–2 || Hildebrand (9–4) || Smith (9–10) || || Yankee Stadium || 3,608 || 100–43
|-style=background:#bfb
| 145 || September 20 || White Sox || 8–4 || Sundra (11–0) || Lyons (13–6) || || Yankee Stadium || 2,977 || 101–43
|-style=background:#bfb
| 146 || September 21 || White Sox || 5–2 || Russo (8–3) || Dietrich (7–8) || || Yankee Stadium || 2,150 || 102–43
|-style=background:#bfb
| 147 || September 23 || @ Senators || 7–1 || Pearson (12–5) || Leonard (19–8) || || Griffith Stadium || 8,000 || 103–43
|-style=background:#bfb
| 148 || September 24 || @ Senators || 3–2 || Chandler (3–0) || Chase (10–19) || || Griffith Stadium || 12,000 || 104–43
|-style=background:#bfb
| 149 || September 28 || Athletics || 8–4 || Hildebrand (10–4) || McCrabb (1–2) || || Yankee Stadium || – || 105–43
|-style=background:#fbb
| 150 || September 28 || Athletics || 4–5 || Caster (9–9) || Hadley (12–6) || || Yankee Stadium || 4,187 || 105–44
|-style=background:#bfb
| 151 || September 30 || Red Sox || 5–4 || Murphy (3–6) || Bagby (5–5) || || Yankee Stadium || – || 106–44
|-style=background:#fbb
| 152 || September 30 || Red Sox || 2–4 (7) || Wilson (11–11) || Sundra (11–1) || || Yankee Stadium || 7,501 || 106–45

Record vs. opponents

Notable transactions 
 April 8, 1939: Len Gabrielson was traded by the Yankees to the Philadelphia Phillies for Pete Sivess and cash.

Roster

Player stats

Batting

Starters by position
Note: Pos = Position; G = Games played; AB = At bats; H = Hits; Avg. = Batting average; HR = Home runs; RBI = Runs batted in

Other batters
Note: G = Games played; AB = At bats; H = Hits; Avg. = Batting average; HR = Home runs; RBI = Runs batted in

Pitching

Starting pitchers
Note: G = Games pitched; IP = Innings pitched; W = Wins; L = Losses; ERA = Earned run average; SO = Strikeouts

Other pitchers
Note: G = Games pitched; IP = Innings pitched; W = Wins; L = Losses; ERA = Earned run average; SO = Strikeouts

Relief pitchers
Note: G = Games pitched; W = Wins; L = Losses; SV = Saves; ERA = Earned run average; SO = Strikeouts

1939 World Series 

AL New York Yankees (4) vs. NL Cincinnati Reds (0)

Awards and honors

Team 
The book Baseball Dynasties: The Greatest Teams of All Time ranked the 1939 Yankees the greatest MLB team of all time. In 2017, website FiveThirtyEight ranked the 1939 Yankees as the greatest team of all time (across major North American sports leagues), based on Elo rating.

In the MLB modern era (since 1900), the 1939 Yankees have recorded the best run differential, +411, having scored 967 runs while allowing 556.

Individuals 
The Yankees, in hosting the 1939 All-Star Game at Yankee Stadium, were represented by Red Ruffing, Joe DiMaggio, Joe Gordon, Bill Dickey, Lefty Gomez, Frankie Crosetti, George Selkirk and Johnny Murphy. Lou Gehrig attended the game as part of the AL reserves and did not play.

Joe DiMaggio won his first of three Most Valuable Player (MVP) Awards, though he only played 120 games due to injury. He batted .381 and averaged over one RBI per game.

Farm system

LEAGUE CHAMPIONS: Augusta

Notes

References
 1939 New York Yankees at Baseball Reference
 1939 World Series
 1939 New York Yankees team page at www.baseball-almanac.com
 

New York Yankees seasons
New York Yankees
New York Yankees
1930s in the Bronx
American League champion seasons
World Series champion seasons